"Black and Gold" is a 2008 song by Sam Sparro.

Black and Gold may also refer to:

 Black and Gold (book), a 1987 book by Anthony Sampson
 "Black and Gold" (Cornish song), a Cornish folk song
 Black + Gold, a 2007 EP by Sam Sparro
 "Black & Gold", a song by Sivert Høyem featured in the opening sequence of the Norwegian television show Okkupert
 Anarcho-capitalism, symbolized by black and gold
 A nickname for the American Pittsburgh Steelers football team, based on their black and gold team colors

See also
 Black-and-gold tanager, bird found in Colombia
 Black-and-gold cotinga, bird found in Brazil
 Black Gold (disambiguation)